Achille Morin (1872 – 1929) was a French fencer. He competed in the men's épée event at the 1900 Summer Olympics.

References

External links
 

1872 births
1929 deaths
French male épée fencers
Olympic fencers of France
Fencers at the 1900 Summer Olympics
Place of birth missing
Date of birth missing
Date of death missing